The Spyker B6 Venator is a concept car built by Dutch manufacturer Spyker Cars and first shown to the public at the Geneva Motor Show in April 2013. It was planned for production by 2014.

The mid engined, rear-wheel drive concept is powered by a yet-to-be specified V6 engine, producing , mated to a six-speed automatic.

The B6 is thought to be based on the Artega GT which ceased production in 2012 due to bankruptcy.
This has not been confirmed by Spyker.

References

External links

Sports cars
B6
2010s cars